River 1467 (official callsign: 3ML) is a commercial radio station owned and operated by Grant Broadcasters. The station is broadcast to the Sunraysia region located on the Victoria–New South Wales border from studios in Mildura.

The station launched in 1997 as Easymix 1467 by Elmie Investments, following 3MA's conversion to the FM band. On 15 June 2016, the station relaunched as River 1467.

In November 2021, River 1467, along with other stations owned by Grant Broadcasters, were acquired by the Australian Radio Network. This deal allows Grant's stations, including River 1467, to access ARN's iHeartRadio platform in regional areas. The deal was finalized on January 4, 2022. It is expected River 1467 will integrate with ARN's Pure Gold Network, but will retain its current name according to the press release from ARN.

Programming
Local programming is produced and broadcast from the station's Mildura studios from 5.30am weekdays. The station's local output consists of a three-hour breakfast show presented by Jason Hayes, the drive show with Damion Bradshaw, and David Burrows hosting across the weekend mornings. Additional locally branded programs are pre-recorded (i.e. not live) from the studios of Gold Central Victoria.

Syndicated programming includes Mornings with Neil Mitchell and the 20/20 Retro Countdown with Aaron Stevens.

References

External links

Easy listening radio stations in Australia
Radio stations established in 1933
Radio stations in Victoria
Australian Radio Network